Wabasha Bridge may refer to:

Wabasha-Nelson Bridge, connecting Wabasha, Minnesota, and Nelson, Wisconsin
Wabasha Street Bridge in St. Paul, Minnesota